The 1971 San Francisco 49ers season was the franchise's 22nd season in the National Football League and their 26th overall. The 49ers appeared in the NFC Championship Game for the second consecutive year. The team moved into a new home, Candlestick Park. After winning two of their first three games on the road the 49ers lost their first game at Candlestick Park to the Los Angeles Rams 20–13. The 49ers would rebound and win the NFC West for the second year in a row by posting a 9–5 record. However, for the second year in a row the 49ers’ season ended in disappointment with a 14–3 loss in the NFC Championship Game to the Cowboys in Dallas.

Offseason

Roster

Regular season

Schedule

Standings

Playoffs

NFC Championship Game

References

External links 
 1971 49ers on Pro Football Reference
 49ers Schedule on jt-sw.com

San Francisco 49ers
NFC West championship seasons
San Francisco 49ers seasons
1971 in San Francisco
San